The BAE Systems Ampersand unmanned autonomous system (UAS) is an unmanned autogyro technology demonstrator, first announced at the 2008 Farnborough International Air Show. The Ampersand is based on the RotorSport UK MT-03 autogyro, with a sensor suite derived from the BAE Herti UAV. It is capable of being flown manned, for flight test purposes.

See also

References

British Aerospace aircraft
Unmanned aerial vehicles of the United Kingdom
Single-engined pusher autogyros
Unmanned helicopters